The 1992 International Austrian Indoor Championships was a women's tennis tournament played on indoor carpet courts at the Intersport Arena in Linz, Austria that was part of Tier V of the 1992 WTA Tour. It was the sixth edition of the tournament and was held from 10 February through 16 February 1992.Unseeded Natalia Medvedeva won the singles title and earned $18,000 first-prize money as well as 110 ranking points.

Finals

Singles
 Natalia Medvedeva defeated  Pascale Paradis 6–4, 6–2
 It was Medvedeva's 1st singles title of the year and the 2nd of her career.

Doubles
 Monique Kiene /  Miriam Oremans defeated  Claudia Porwik /  Raffaella Reggi 6–4, 6–2
 It was Kiene's only doubles title of her career. It was Oremans' only doubles title of the year and the first of her career.

References

External links
 WTA tournament edition details
 ITF tournament edition details

EA-Generali Ladies Linz
Linz Open
EA-Generali Ladies Linz
EA-Generali Ladies Linz
Generali